Hooleya can refer to:

Hooleya (plant), an extinct genus in the family Juglandaceae
Hooleya (planthopper), a genus of Achilid planthoppers